Alexander John "Sandy" Mackenzie (born 29 August 1941) is a former Australian politician. He was born in Melbourne and educated at Geelong Grammar School and the University of New England. He became an agricultural scientist, and then principal of the Orange Agricultural College. In 1975, he was elected to the Australian House of Representatives as the National Country Party member for Calare. He held the seat until 1983, when he was defeated by Labor's David Simmons.

References

National Party of Australia members of the Parliament of Australia
Members of the Australian House of Representatives for Calare
Members of the Australian House of Representatives
1941 births
Living people
University of New England (Australia) alumni
20th-century Australian politicians